KODF-LD (channel 26) is a low-powered television station in Dallas, Texas, United States and serving the Dallas–Fort Worth Metroplex. The station's transmitter is located in Cedar Hill, Texas.

History
The station began its broadcasting activities in 2003 as an America's Store affiliate with callsign K67BL. Shortly after, the station moved its broadcasts to channel 26 and was rebranded as K26HF. On December 23, 2003, the station switched formats to Spanish-language programming as it was affiliated with Azteca América. During that time, the station was rebranded as KODF from TV Azteca's flagship station XHDF (meaning Distrito Federal) and Una Vez Mas Holdings took over ownership, with Mako Communications retaining as licensee.

In late 2006, KODF began simulcasting on KLEG-LP channel 44 to cover areas north and east of this station. In January 2007, KODF started airing several 90-second newsbriefs on weekdays, produced by local CBS affiliate KTVT.
The end of the newscast taglines read "Una Vez Más Holdings, LLC."

On June 25, 2009, KODF ceased analog broadcasting in response to an interference complaint from NBC affiliate KTEN (channel 10). On November 22, they began broadcasting in digital on RF channel 27 (virtual channel 26) under special temporary authority from the Federal Communications Commission (FCC). On March 24, 2010, the FCC granted a license to cover the construction permit for channel 27. During that time, Una Vez Mas returned this station to Mako Communications.

In January 2010, KODF became a Mega TV affiliate under their branding "Mega 26 HD" under the new direction of Right Hook Media Group, Inc. and was the first low-powered digital channel in the Dallas/Fort Worth area to broadcast in 1080i high definition if not the first in the nation.

On September 11, 2011, KODF became affiliated with HOT TV (History of Television), broadcasting classic TV programs and movies from the 1940s, 1950s and 1960s.

In June 2013, KODF-LD was slated to be sold to Landover 5 LLC as part of a larger deal involving 51 other low-power television stations; the sale fell through in June 2016. Mako Communications sold its stations, including KODF-LD, to HC2 Holdings in 2017.

On June 18, 2019, KODF-LD shut down its channel 27 digital transmitter as a part of the broadcast frequency repacking process following the 2016-2017 FCC incentive auction.  The station remains silent while it constructs its post-repack facility on assigned displacement channel 3.

Digital channels
Before going silent, the station's signal was multiplexed:

References

External links

KODF-LD
Television channels and stations established in 2003
Low-power television stations in the United States